Sarkis Hayrapetyan ( Sargis Hayrapetyany; born 22 July 1992) is an Armenian figure skater. His father, Samvel Hayrapetyan, is his coach, and his younger brother, Slavik Hayrapetyan, is also a competitive skater.

Programs

Competitive highlights 
JGP: Junior Grand Prix

References

External links 

Sarkis Hayrapetyan at sport-folio.net
Sarkis Hayrapetyan at Tracings

1992 births
Armenian figure skaters
Living people
Sportspeople from Yerevan